Milestones (or Milestones to the Kingdom) is a non-commercial, Bible magazine published annually by the Christadelphians. The magazine's focus is Bible prophecy, and its intention (according to the magazine's website) is to review the 'events of the past year in the light of Bible prophecy'. The 2007 edition (Milestones to the Kingdom 2006: A Review of the World Events of 2006 in the Light of Bible Prophecy) is the 30th issue. Milestones Updates also appear quarterly in another Christadelphian publication, The Bible Magazine, and Milestones Snippets (an email list covering current affairs articles 'of interest to students of Bible prophecy') is available approximately twice a week.

The main author of the magazine is a Christadelphian from the UK, Donald Pearce from Rugby, Warwickshire. Until 1992 Donald's father, Graham, wrote it and in 1993 & 1994 father and son wrote it together. The publisher is the Australian-based Christadelphian Scripture Study Service (CSSS). All members of the CSSS are active members of Christadelphian congregations subscribing to the Birmingham Amended Statement of Faith (BASF).

In 2007 some 4,000 copies of the magazine were sent to several countries around the world
including Australia, New Zealand, Canada, America, the UK and South Africa. Subscriptions and limited back issues are available to order from the Milestones and CSSS websites. Milestones 2006 is also available in audio format on cassette tape, CD and MP3.

Related events
Each year Signs of Our Times "Prophecy Days" are organised around the world partly in conjunction with Milestones magazine. According to the Milestones website, the purpose of these days is to 'provide [Christadelphians] with sound reasons why we can still have confidence in our Christadelphian heritage in the area of Bible prophecy. Our traditional beliefs will be presented in a contemporary, stimulating way'. In the UK, Prophecy Days are usually held in the Midlands, Kent and South West Wales; there are also regularly Prophecy Days in the United States, Canada, Australia and New Zealand. The Signs of Our Times "Prophecy Days" can now be found on YouTube Milestones to the Kingdom 2012

References

External links
Milestones magazine (official site)
Christadelphian Scriptrue Study Service (CSSU)
Bible Magazine

Christadelphian magazines